Gervase Clifton may refer to:

Sir Gervase Clifton (died 1471), English knight and landowner
Gervase Clifton (MP) (died 1588), English Member of Parliament for Nottinghamshire (UK Parliament constituency)
Gervase Clifton, 1st Baron Clifton (c. 1570–1618)
Sir Gervase Clifton, 1st Baronet (1587–1666), "Sir Gervase with seven wives"
Sir Gervase Clifton, 2nd Baronet (1612–1675)
Sir Gervase Clifton, 4th Baronet (1666–1731), briefly imprisoned as a Jacobite sympathiser in 1715
Sir Gervase Clifton, 6th Baronet (1744–1815), High Sheriff of Nottinghamshire in 1767

See also
Clifton (surname)

Clifton family